Daniel Lambo (10 May 1968) is a Belgian film director, film producer and screenwriter.

Biography 
Lambo directed his first short film, dJU! in 2002. This black comedy won the Jury Prize and the Audience Award at the Leuven International Short Film Festival.

A few years later he founded the production company Potemkino and produced a number of films, such as the award-winning Small Gods (2007).

Lambo's first feature film, Miss Homeless (2010), was written, produced, directed, filmed and edited entirely by himself. This docufiction about homeless people in Brussels premiered in twelve countries on the International Day for the Eradication of Poverty.

His production company Lambo Films emphasizes on socially relevant films. Dry Branches of Iran (2012) for instance deals with censorship during the Green Revolution in Iran. The first Belgian film shot on smart phones.  His next film De Figurant (2016) takes on racial stereotypes with a story about a drug dealer that has acting ambitions. In the documentary Breathless Lambo investigates the delocalization of the asbestos industry to developing countries. On 13 September 2019 Breathless won the Ensor Award in the category best documentary film 2019  His latest feature Cyclomax deals with air pollution. It is also the first Belgian webseries for kids. 

In addition to his own productions, Lambo remains active as a director and screenwriter for other projects. He co-created the TV series Duts (2010) and the comedy Los Flamencos (2013). He was the screenwriter for VTM-series "Crème de la crème" (2013), "Connie & Clyde" (2018) en "Glad Ijs" (2021).

Filmography 
 Glad Ijs (2021): screenwriter
 Cyclomax (2019): producer, screenwriter and director
 Breathless (2018): producer, screenwriter and director
 Connie & Clyde (2018): screenwriter
 De Figurant (2016): producer, screenwriter and director
 Booster (2014): producer, screenwriter and director
 Los Flamencos (2013): screenwriter and director
 Traumland (2013): producer, screenwriter and director
 Crème de la crème (2013): screenwriter
 Dry Branches of Iran (2012): producer, screenwriter and director
 Duts (TV-serie, 2010): co-director
 Miss Homeless (2010): producer, screenwriter and director
 Where Is Gary (2009): producer
 Vanessa Danse Encore (2009): producer
 Brusilia (kortfilm, 2008): producer, screenwriter and director
 Samaritan (kortfilm, 2008): producer
 Tunnelrat (kortfilm, 2008): producer
 Small Gods (2007): producer
 Of Cats & Women (kortfilm, 2007): producer
 Kadogo (kortfilm, 2006): producer, screenwriter and director
 Nightshift (kortfilm, 2006): producer
 Gender (kortfilm, 2004): producer, screenwriter and director
 eLLektra (2004): screenwriter
 Dju! (kortfilm, 2002): screenwriter and director

References

External links 
 Official website Lambo Films
 Daniel Lambo in the Internet Movie Database

Belgian film directors
Belgian film producers
Belgian screenwriters
Living people
Date of birth missing (living people)
Year of birth missing (living people)